The 2009 Women's British Open was held 30 July – 2 August at Royal Lytham & St Annes Golf Club in Lancashire, England. It was the 33rd Women's British Open and the ninth as a major championship on the LPGA Tour. Catriona Matthew won her only  major, three strokes ahead of runner-up Karrie Webb.

It was the fourth Women's British Open at Royal Lytham and the third as an LPGA major, most recently in 2006. The course had also hosted ten Open Championships, most recently in 2001.

Matthew became the first Scot to win the title, just eleven weeks after giving birth to her second child in mid-May.

Field

Past champions in the field

Made the cut

Missed the cut

Course layout

Source:

Previous lengths of the course for the Women's British Open (since 2001):
 2006: , par 72 
 2003: , par 72

Round summaries

First round
Thursday, 30 July 2009

Second round
Friday, 31 July 2009

Third round
Saturday, 1 August 2009

Final round
Sunday, 2 August 2009

Source:

Scorecard
Final round

Cumulative tournament scores, relative to par
{|class="wikitable" span = 50 style="font-size:85%;
|-
|style="background: Red;" width=10|
|Eagle
|style="background: Pink;" width=10|
|Birdie
|style="background: PaleGreen;" width=10|
|Bogey
|style="background: Green;" width=10|
|Double bogey
|}

References

External links
Ladies European Tour: 2009 Ricoh Women's British Open results
LPGA: 2009 Ricoh Women's British Open results

Women's British Open
Golf tournaments in England
British Open
Women's British Open
Women's British Open
Women's British Open
2000s in Lancashire